Ellis Clarkson (1887 – October 1947) was an English professional rugby league footballer who played in the 1900s and 1910s. He played at representative level for England, Rugby League XIII and Lancashire, and at club level for Leigh (two spells) and Hull FC, as a goal-kicking .

Playing career

Club career
Clarkson started his career with Leigh in 1904 and helped them win the League championship in the 1905–06 season. 

He joined Hull F.C. in 1910, spending three seasons at the club. His final game for Hull was a 3–17 defeat against Batley in the 1912 Yorkshire Cup final. He returned to Leigh in 1913. 

He last played for Leigh in the 1918–19 season before being forced to retire due to a knee injury. He made 214 appearances during his two spells at Leigh.

International honours
Ellis Clarkson won caps for England while at Hull in 1910 against Wales, in 1911 against Wales, and in 1912 against Wales.

County honours
Ellis Clarkson represented Lancashire while at Hull, and is one of only four players to do so, they are; Ellis Clarkson, Bob Taylor, Dick Gemmell and Steve Prescott.

Genealogical information
Ellis Clarkson was the older brother of the rugby league footballer; Tom Clarkson.

References

External links
(archived by web.archive.org) Stats → Past Players → C at hullfc.com (statistics for player surnames beginning with 'C' and 'D' swapped)
(archived by web.archive.org) Stats → Past Players at hullfc.com

1880s births
1947 deaths
England national rugby league team players
English rugby league players
Hull F.C. players
Lancashire rugby league team players
Leigh Leopards captains
Leigh Leopards players
Place of death missing
Rugby league fullbacks
Rugby league players from Leigh, Greater Manchester
Rugby League XIII players